Jack Chow is an American professor of public health.  He holds the position of Distinguished Service Professor at Carnegie Mellon University Heinz College.  Chow held a number of global public health offices including positions as the first Assistant Director-General of the World Health Organization on HIV/AIDS, Tuberculosis, and Malaria, Special Representative of the U.S. Secretary of State on Global HIV/AIDS and Deputy Assistant Secretary of State for Health and Science. This was a first - "first U.S. diplomat of ambassador rank appointed to a public health mission."

In 2020, Chow, along with over 130 other former Republican national security officials, signed a statement that asserted that President Trump was unfit to serve another term, and "To that end, we are firmly convinced that it is in the best interest of our nation that Vice President Joe Biden be elected as the next President of the United States, and we will vote for him."

Education
 BA, Political Science, University of Pennsylvania
 MS, University of California, Berkeley School of Public Health – UCSF Joint Medical Program 
 MD, Medicine, University of California, San Francisco - School of Medicine 
 MPA, International Policy, Harvard University Kennedy School of Government 
 MBA, Finance, The University of Chicago - Booth School of Business
 CFA, Chartered Financial Analyst

References

External links
 Carnegie Mellon University faculty page

American people of Chinese descent
Carnegie Mellon University faculty
Living people
Year of birth missing (living people)
American public health doctors
University of Pennsylvania alumni
Harvard Kennedy School alumni
UC Berkeley School of Public Health alumni
University of California, San Francisco alumni
University of Chicago Booth School of Business alumni
World Health Organization officials
American officials of the United Nations
CFA charterholders